In  homological algebra, the Bockstein homomorphism, introduced by , is a connecting homomorphism associated with a short exact sequence

of abelian groups, when they are introduced as coefficients into a chain complex C, and which appears in the homology groups as a homomorphism reducing degree by one,

To be more precise, C should be a complex of free, or at least torsion-free, abelian groups, and the homology is of the complexes formed by tensor product with C (some flat module condition should enter). The construction of β is by the usual argument (snake lemma).

A similar construction applies to cohomology groups, this time increasing degree by one. Thus we have

The Bockstein homomorphism  associated to the coefficient sequence

is used as one of the generators of the  Steenrod algebra. This Bockstein homomorphism has the following two properties:
,
;
in other words, it is a superderivation acting on the cohomology mod p of a space.

See also 
Bockstein spectral sequence

References

 
 .

Algebraic topology
Homological algebra